Improvisational-theater festivals, also known as improv-comedy festivals or improv festivals, are venues where multiple improvisational-theater groups perform.

They are usually not limited by improvisational style, though they may limit entrants to professional-only or collegiate-only.

Most improvisational-theater festivals are hosted by a single troupe, but others are hosted by conglomerations of troupes or a company set up solely for that given festival.

Festivals

See also

 List of festivals
 List of improvisational theatre companies

References

Improvisational theatre festivals

Improvisational theatre
Improvisational